Walter H. Tyler  (March 28, 1909 – November 3, 1990) was an American art director. He won an Academy Award and was nominated for eight more in the category Best Art Direction. He was born in Los Angeles, California and died in Orange County, California. His grandson is film composer Brian Tyler.

Selected filmography
Tyler won an Academy Award for Best Art Direction and was nominated for eight more:
Won
 Samson and Delilah (1949)
Nominated
 Kitty (1945)
 Roman Holiday (1953)
 Sabrina (1954)
 The Ten Commandments (1956)
 Career (1959)
 Visit to a Small Planet (1960)
 Summer and Smoke (1961)
 The Island at the Top of the World (1974)

References

External links

1909 births
1990 deaths
American art directors
Best Art Direction Academy Award winners
People from Los Angeles